Leptobrachella brevicrus (sometimes known as the Dring's Borneo frog) is a species of amphibian in the family Megophryidae.
It is only known from its type locality in Gunung Mulu National Park, Sarawak, Malaysia.
Its natural habitat are stream sides in tropical moist montane forests.

References

External links
 Sound recordings of Leptobrachella brevicrus at BioAcoustica

brevicrus
Amphibians of Malaysia
Endemic fauna of Malaysia
Endemic fauna of Borneo
Amphibians described in 1983
Taxonomy articles created by Polbot
Amphibians of Borneo